The Société des Amis des Universités de Paris (SAUP; English: the Society of Friends of the Universities of Paris) is a public utility and non-profit association of private status regulated by the French law of 1901 on associations. It has been founded in 1899 for social and humanitarian purposes.

The SAUP has been presided by a number of prestigious chairmen: Jean-Casimir Perier and Raymond Poincaré (former French Presidents), René Cassin (Nobel peace prize-winner), members of the Institute, many famous scholars ...

It is currently presided by Chief Education Officer Jean-Louis Boursin, Professor at the Institut d’Etudes Politiques de Paris, former president of Conference of Chief Education Officer. The two Vice Chairmen are Professor Jean Mesnard, member of the Institut, and Professor Jean-Robert Pitte, President of the Paris-Sorbonne University (Paris IV). According to its statutes, the first Vice-President of the SAUP is the Rector-Chancellor of the Paris University.

This association, intended to develop the French culture around the world, created in 1919 the Cours de Civilisation Française de la Sorbonne, a French as a foreign language school which provides French language and civilisation classes for foreigners.

Recently, the SAUP has created two other programs:

 Sorbonne dans la Ville, a series of lectures given by professors of Paris University for the general public.
 The FLE Français langue étrangère Collection, performed by the major academic publisher Belin, whose two first books were published in 2007.

The Société des Amis des Universités de Paris was dissolved in 2009 to be erected Foundation of Public Utility, the Foundation Robert de Sorbon.

External links

 The SAUP’s Administration Bureau and Board of Directors 
 Cours de Civilisation Française de la Sorbonne official website 
 Sorbonne dans la Ville 

Organisation internationale de la Francophonie
French-language education
University of Paris
1899 establishments in France
Organizations established in 1899